Seeon Lakes (German: Seeoner Seen) is a small group of kettle lakes in Bavaria, Germany. The lakes are protected as the nature reserve (German: Naturschutzgebiet) Seeoner Seen. On the main lake Seeoner See is a field station for limnological research from the University of Munich, Faculty of Biology.

Lakes
 Klostersee (Seeoner See)  
 Griessee 
 Brunnensee  (deapest lake )
 Seeleitensee 
 Mittersee (Esterpointersee) 
 Jägersee 
 Bansee

References

External links

  Office for Water management, District Traunstein

Lakes of Bavaria
LSeeon
Nature reserves in Bavaria
Ponds of Europe
Traunstein (district)
Kettle lakes in Germany